Bassam Tohme (born 1969) is the Syrian Minister of Oil and Mineral Resources.

Life and education
He was born in Safita in 1969. He has got a degree in petroleum engineering from al-Ba’ath University in 1993. He got married with three children.

Career
He started work in the Syrian Petroleum Company, Al-Gebsa Fields Directorate in 1993 and he was an engineer in the Central region gas project from 1993 to 1995.

Head of the Gas Collection and Processing Department of the Syrian Gas Company from 2003 to 2005.

He was appointed as Director of Service Contracts of the General Petroleum Corporation from 18 November 2018.

References 

1969 births
Living people
21st-century Syrian politicians
Oil and mineral reserves ministers of Syria
Al-Baath University
People from Tartus Governorate

See also 
 Petroleum industry in Syria
 Ministry of Oil and Mineral Resources (Syria)